Beauty and the Breast is a 2002 Hong Kong comedy film directed by Raymond Yip, and starring Francis Ng, Michelle Reis and Daniel Wu.

Synopsis

The story is about Mario (Ng), who is an office loafer who specializes in praising and pleasing his boss, the good-for-nothing eldest son of a business tycoon. Mario considers Harper (Wu) his apprentice, and together the two go about town picking up women.  Mario has a theory that links the characteristics of a woman's breasts to her character. Without knowing that Yuki (Reis) is going to be his new colleague, he predicts her to be of his type from the shape of her breasts while she is standing outside a glass window of a restaurant. Despite his deserving reputation of being a womanizer, Mario is really kind at heart, but he is soon lured into a bet with his boss and has to get Yuki into bed to win it. He comes up with the brilliant plan of telling her that he has a malignant brain tumor in its terminal stage.  Thanks to his acting skill, she totally buys his story. Using his smooth tongue, Mario soon turns Yuki's sympathy into love. But it is not long before Yuki brings him home and her father, who is a Chinese traditional medicine doctor, diagnose his lie. Quietly Yuki and her female colleagues strike back with a vengeance. She fools Mario and his sidekick, Harper, into taking an excessively large dose of a highly potent breast-enlarging tonic her father had concocted. Soon the two men are endowed with cup sizes many women would envy, but would freak men out.

Cast
 Francis Ng as Mario
 Michelle Reis as Yuki
 Daniel Wu as Harper
 Halina Tam as Amy
 Amanda Strang as Ada
 Angela Tong as Lilliana
 Sophie Ngan as Cathalina
 Matt Chow as Brother Fat 
 Lam Chi-chung as Choi
 Wong Yat-fei as Chan Pak-cheung
 Wong Tin-lam as Chu Senior
 Ching Siu-lung as Mr. Lei
 Gobby Wong as Clerk
 Ng Choi-yuk as Clerk

References

External links
 

2002 films
2002 comedy films
Hong Kong comedy films
2000s Cantonese-language films
Media Asia films
Films directed by Raymond Yip
Films set in Hong Kong
Films shot in Hong Kong
2000s Hong Kong films